Rui Jorge Costa Figueiredo (known as Rui Figueiredo) (born 7 April 1983 in Barcelos, Portugal) is a Portuguese football midfielder who plays for SC Cabreiros.

As a kid he joined Gil Vicente, a well-known club in Portugal's Premier league.  He made his debut when 17 years old against S.L. Benfica and played for six years, in more than 60 games, in the league.

Then he joined C.D. Aves, becoming an important player in the Portuguese Second Division. He came with C.D. Aves to first division again and played in 2006. He also played for Portugal u-16 becoming European Champion in Israel 2000, also winning the Toulon Tournament in 2003. Figueiredo has 54 caps and 10 goals to his credit.

After playing a season for APEP Pitsilias in the Cypriot First Division, he was a regular starter, he moved to Onisilos Sotira he scored 8 league goals becoming the second best scorer of the team. This season 2010-2011 he moved to Nea Salamis Famagusta FC.

External links
 

1983 births
Living people
People from Barcelos, Portugal
Portuguese footballers
Portuguese expatriate footballers
Association football midfielders
Expatriate footballers in Cyprus
Portuguese expatriate sportspeople in Cyprus
Gil Vicente F.C. players
APEP FC players
C.D. Aves players
Onisilos Sotira players
Nea Salamis Famagusta FC players
Varzim S.C. players
Primeira Liga players
Cypriot First Division players
Cypriot Second Division players
Sportspeople from Braga District